The Canal Street station was a station on the demolished IRT Second Avenue Line in Manhattan, New York City. It had two levels. The lower level had two tracks and two side platforms and the upper level had one track that served the express trains. The next stop to the north was Grand Street. The next stop to the south was Chatham Square. The station closed on June 13, 1942.

References

External links

IRT Second Avenue Line stations
Railway stations closed in 1880
Railway stations closed in 1942
Former elevated and subway stations in Manhattan